FC Köniz are a football team from  Köniz, Switzerland, is currently playing in the Swiss Promotion League. The club was founded in 1933, with the recorded founding being 1 July 1933, and after originally playing in the lower tiers of Swiss football, were promoted to the Promotion League in 2013.

Current squad

References

External links
 Official Website

Association football clubs established in 1933
Köniz,FC
1933 establishments in Switzerland